Timing Is Everything is singer Chris de Burgh's fourteenth original album, released in 2002.

Track listing
All compositions by Chris de Burgh except as noted.
"Guilty Secret" – 3:50
"If Beds Could Talk" – 3:47
"Lebanese Night" featuring Elissa  – 4:46
"Timing Is Everything" – 4:47
"There's Room in This Heart Tonight" – 3:37
"She Must Have Known" – 3:30 (de Burgh, Mark Spiro)
"The Best That Love Can Be" – 3:58
"Bal Masqué" – 3:28
"Love and Time" – 4:16
"Another Rainbow" – 3:47
"Save Me" – 2:47

Personnel 

 Chris de Burgh – lead and backing vocals
 Peter Gordeno – keyboards
 James Nisbet – guitars
 Phil Palmer – guitars
 Rick Mitra – bass, drums, percussion
 Tee Green – backing vocals
 Shelley Nelson – backing vocals
 Elissa Khoury – guest vocals on "Lebanese Night"

Production 

 Produced by Chris de Burgh and Chris Porter
 Engineered and Mixed by Chris Porter
 Sleeve Design – Chris de Burgh, David Larkham and Mike McCraith.
 Portrait Photo – David Morley
 Russian Photos – Alex "Professor" Lebedinsky

Chris de Burgh albums
2002 albums
A&M Records albums